Sørland is a Seaside resort, fishing village and the administrative centre of Værøy Municipality in Nordland county, Norway. It is located on the southern side of the island of Værøya. The village is the main population center of the island, and it is the location of Værøy Church, Værøy Heliport, and Værøy Lighthouse. There are no other villages on the island.

Sørland has ferry connections to the nearby village of Røstlandet, the town of Bodø, and the village of Sørvågen.

Media gallery

References

Værøy
Villages in Nordland
Populated places of Arctic Norway
Seaside resorts in Norway